The 1966 Smoky Mountain 200 was a NASCAR Grand National Series event that was held on July 28, 1966, at Smoky Mountain Raceway in Maryville, Tennessee.

The transition to purpose-built racecars began in the early 1960s and occurred gradually over that decade.  Changes made to the sport by the late 1960s brought an end to the "strictly stock" vehicles of the 1950s.

Race report
This 200-lap race would last for nearly one and a half hours; six thousand spectators would watch an event where Richard Petty became the last-place finisher by virtue of steering problems on the 17th lap. Buddy Baker and David Pearson would dominate much of the race. Paul Lewis would go on to defeat Pearson by a time of two seconds; making it his only career victory in a car of his own ownership after starting two cars away from last in this unlikely triumph. Lewis would dominate the final 64 laps of this event and would never let go. Unfortunately, Lewis was never able to record another victory in his NASCAR Cup Series career after the end of this event.

Out of the 29 drivers on the grid, there was only one foreigner in the event - Canadian-born Don Biederman. Buzz Gregory became the lowest-finishing driver to finish the race; he was 84 laps behind the lead lap drivers. The number of cautions for this event was never recorded. Notable crew chiefs that would make an appearance at this race were Herman Beam, Bob Cooper, Clair Jackson, Frankie Scott, Dale Inman and Bud Hartje.

1975 & 1976 Late Model Sportsman Champion and longtime Sportsman and Busch Series Veteran L.D. Ottinger made his Grand National debut; he would not return to the Cup Series until 1973. Ottinger made his last Cup race in 1984, driving for Rod Benfield and the #98 Levi Garrett team, replacing the recently released Joe Ruttman for two races. He finished 21st and 22nd at Charlotte and North Wilkesboro Speedway, respectively.

Buddy Baker clinched the pole position for this racing event with his top speed of  during solo qualifying sessions. Individual race earnings for each driver ranged from $1,000 ($ when adjusted for inflation) to $100 ($ when adjusted for inflation). The total prize purse offered for this NASCAR event was $4,940 ($ when adjusted for inflation).

Qualifying

Top 20 finishers

Timeline
Section reference: 
 Start of race: Buddy Baker started the race with the pole position.
 Lap 17: Richard Petty failed to control his steering in a safe manner.
 Lap 18: David Pearson takes over the lead from Buddy Baker.
 Lap 32: L.D. Ottinger noticed that his fender fell off his vehicle.
 Lap 34: Jabe Thomas developed engine problems, forcing him to exit from the race.
 Lap 78: Ned Jarrett overheated his race car, causing him to leave the race prematurely.
 Lap 87: Buddy Arrington's fuel pump stopped acting properly, bringing his day to an end with a 24th-place finish.
 Lap 116: Buddy Baker takes over the lead from David Pearson.
 Lap 134: Buddy Baker had a terminal crash, forcing him to withdraw from the event.
 Lap 135: David Pearson takes over the lead from Buddy Baker.
 Lap 137: Paul Lewis takes over the lead from David Pearson.
 Finish: Paul Lewis was officially declared the winner of the event.

References

Smoky Mountain 200
Smoky Mountain 200
NASCAR races at Smoky Mountain Raceway